Amadou Pathé Diallo (born 11 October 1964) is a Malian professional football player and manager.

Career
Amadou Diallo played for the Portuguese clubs Sporting CP, Académico Viseu, F.C. Penafiel, CDR Quarteirense and Portimonense S.C. He was a player of the Mali national football team.

In 2006, 2012 and 2013 he was an interim coach of the Mali national football team.

References

External links
 
 Profile at Soccerpunter.com
 
 

1964 births
Living people
Malian footballers
Malian expatriate footballers
Mali international footballers
Association football midfielders
Sporting CP footballers
Académico de Viseu F.C. players
F.C. Penafiel players
Portimonense S.C. players
Malian football managers
Mali national football team managers
Sportspeople from Bamako
21st-century Malian people
Expatriate footballers in Portugal
Malian expatriate sportspeople in Portugal